The following is a list of journals and magazines in the field of mycology:

Further reading
 
 

Mycology